John Romilly may refer to:

 John Romilly, 1st Baron Romilly (1802–1874), English judge
 John Romilly, 3rd Baron Romilly, British peer and soldier

See also
 Romilly John (1906–1986), poet, author and an amateur physicist, son of Augustus John
 John Romilly Allen, British archaeologist